The 1949 Georgetown Hoyas football team was an American football team that represented Georgetown University as an independent during the 1949 college football season. In their first season under head coach Bob Margarita, the Hoyas compiled a 5–4 record in the regular season, lost to Texas Western in the 1950 Sun Bowl, and were outscored by all opponents by a total of 210 to 139. The team played its home games at Griffith Stadium in Washington, D.C.

Schedule

References

Georgetown
Georgetown Hoyas football seasons
Georgetown Hoyas football